Hungary has participated in the Eurovision Song Contest 17 times since making its debut in . Hungary attempted to participate in  but failed to qualify from Kvalifikacija za Millstreet, a special qualifying competition set up for seven former Eastern Bloc countries.

Hungary's first contest in 1994 remains its most successful, with Friderika Bayer finishing in fourth place.

History
Hungary received the maximum score of 12 points from the first three countries to vote. However, as the competition progressed, it attracted fewer votes and finished in fourth place.

The  entry was not as successful, garnering only 3 points, narrowly beating last-place Germany. In  Hungary again failed to qualify when "Fortuna", performed by Gjon Delhusa did not qualify from the pre-qualification round.

Hungary withdrew after the  contest. It had planned to return in 2004, but ultimately did not take part in the contest. The song came 9th in Helsinki, receiving 128 points in the final.

After coming last in the semi-final in the  contest, Magyar Televízió (MTV), the Hungarian broadcaster, confirmed Hungary's participation at the  contest in Moscow. After MTV's original choice was revealed to have been released before 1 October 2008, breaking contest rules, it was decided that "Dance with Me", performed by Zoltán Ádok, would be Hungary's entry, after MTV's second choice to represent Hungary declined.

In October 2009, MTV confirmed that they would not participate in the  contest due to financial limitations in the company which would prevent them from sending an entry to the contest in Bærum, Norway. Duna TV broadcast the event live and applied for EBU membership to send a representative to Düsseldorf in 2011. However, during the EBU's 65th conference, Duna TV's bid to become an active member was rejected. In December 2010, it was confirmed that MTV had agreed to return to the 2011 edition. MTV internally selected the song "What About My Dreams?", performed by Kati Wolf. The song placed 7th in the first semi-final with 72 points and was the first entry representing Hungary to qualify for the final since . In the final, the song placed 22nd with 53 points.

In , MTV organised a national final, A Dal, to select the Hungarian entry for the contest in Baku. The song "Sound of Our Hearts", performed by Compact Disco, was selected. The song placed 10th in the first semi-final with 52 points, and 24th in the final with 19 points. As of 2019, A Dal has been used as the Hungarian selection process every year since.

In , Hungary reached the top 10, when the song "Kedvesem (Zoohacker Remix)", performed by ByeAlex, placed 10th with 84 points.

Hungary did not appear on the final list of participants for the later-cancelled  contest; they have been absent from the contest since. MTVA stated that they would "support the valuable productions created by the talents of Hungarian pop music directly" instead of participating in the contest. The withdrawal came during a rise of anti-LGBTQ+ sentiment among the leadership of Hungary and MTVA; while no official reason for the withdrawal was given by the broadcaster, an inside source speaking with the website Index.hu speculated that the contest was considered "too gay" for MTVA to participate.

Participation overview

Awards

Marcel Bezençon Awards

Winner by OGAE members

Barbara Dex Award

Related involvement

Heads of delegation

Commentators and spokespersons

Gallery

Notes and references

Notes

References

External links
 Points to and from Hungary eurovisioncovers.co.uk

 
Countries in the Eurovision Song Contest